Octandre is a chamber piece by Edgard Varèse, written in 1923 and published by J. Curwen & Sons in London in 1924 (new edition, New York: G. Ricordi, 1956; new edition, revised and edited by Chou Wen-chung, New York: Ricordi, 1980). It is dedicated to pianist E. Robert Schmitz.

Octandre consists of three movements:

It is scored for 1 piccolo/flute, 1 oboe, 1 B clarinet/E clarinet, 1 horn, 1 bassoon, 1 trumpet (in C), 1 trombone, 1 double bass.

References

Further reading

 Anderson, John Davis. 1984. "The Influence of Scientific Concepts on the Music and Thought of Edgard Varèse". D.A. diss. Greeley: University of Northern Colorado.
 Babbitt, Milton. 1966. "Edgard Varèse: A Few Observations of His Music". Perspectives of New Music 4, no. 2 (Spring–Summer): 14–22.
 Fulford, William Douglas. 1979. "An Analysis of Sound Masses in Hyperprism, Octandre, and Intégrales, Three Chamber Works by Edgard Varèse". MA Thesis. Fullerton: California State University, Fullerton.
 Koto, Katashi. 1988. "Basic Cells and Hybridization in Varèse's Octandre". Sonus 8, no. 2:59–67.
 Marvin, Elizabeth West. 1991. "The Perception of Rhythm in Non-Tonal Music: Rhythmic Contours in the Music of Edgard Varèse" Music Theory Spectrum 13, no. 1 (Spring): 61–78.
 Post, Nora. 1981–82. "Varèse, Wolpe, and the Oboe". Perspectives of New Music 20, nos. 1–2:135–148.
 Ramsier, Paul. 1972. "An Analysis and Comparison of the Motivic Structure of Octandre and Intégrales, Two Instrumental  Works by Edgard Varèse". PhD diss. New York: New York University.
 Stempel, Larry. 1979.  "Varèse's 'Awkwardness' and the Symmetry in the 'Frame of 12 Tones': An Analytic Approach". The Musical Quarterly 65, no. 2 (April): 148–166.
 Wilheim, András. 1977. "The Genesis of a Specific Twelve-Tone System in the Works of Varèse". Studia Musicologica Academiae Scientiarum Hungaricae 19, nos. 1–4:20–26.
 Wilkinson, Marc. 1961. "Edgard Varèse: Pionier und Prophet". Melos 28:68–76.
 Yang, Yong. 1995. "The Pitch Structure in Edgard Varèse's Octandre". PhD diss. Waltham, Massachusetts: Brandeis University.

Compositions by Edgard Varèse
Modernist compositions
Compositions for octet
1923 compositions
Music dedicated to ensembles or performers